The Quisqueyano Christian Democratic Party is a minor social-conservative, nationalist, Christian-democratic political party of the Dominican Republic. In the 16 May 2006 election, the party was a member of the defeated Grand National Alliance.

References

Christian democratic parties in North America
Political parties in the Dominican Republic